Martin Francis Conroy (December 13, 1922 – December 19, 2006) was an American advertising executive best known for a direct mail ad for the Wall Street Journal that was in continuous use for 28 years, from 1975 to 2003.

Born in Manhattan and a graduate of Xavier High School (New York City), Conroy earned a bachelor's degree in English from the College of the Holy Cross in 1943. He then served in the United States Army in Germany. Upon his return, he took a job as a copywriter at Bloomingdale's. He was on the editorial staff of Esquire magazine when he took a position at BBDO in 1950.

The subscription solicitation letter began:

On a beautiful late spring afternoon, twenty-five years ago, two young men graduated from the same college. They were very much alike, these two young men. Both had been better than average students, both were personable and both — as young college graduates are — were filled with ambitious dreams for the future.

Recently, these men returned to their college for their 25th reunion.

The letter goes on to note that they worked at the same company, but one man was a low-level manager and the other was president. Though the letter does not specifically state it, it implies the more successful man subscribed to the Wall Street Journal. It is widely considered a classic soft sell advertisement.

Conroy died in Branford, Connecticut from complications of lung cancer six days after his 84th birthday. He is survived by his wife Joan, his eight children, and his thirteen grandchildren.

References
 

1922 births
2006 deaths
20th-century American businesspeople
American expatriates in Germany
deaths from cancer in Connecticut
deaths from lung cancer
United States Army personnel of World War II